Pedicularia granulata is a species of sea snail, a marine gastropod mollusk in the family Ovulidae, one of the families of cowry allies.

Description

Distribution

References

Pediculariinae
Gastropods described in 1998